Friends School Haverford is a private, Quaker elementary school near Philadelphia, Pennsylvania which educates students in Grades Nursery School (starting at 2 years 7 months) through Fifth Grade. The school was founded in 1885,  and is the oldest Quaker school on Philadelphia's Main Line. Grades Nursery School to Kindergarten are in one building, while grades first grade to eighth grade are in the main building.

Friends School Haverford is under the care of Haverford Monthly Meeting of Friends.

References

External links

Private elementary schools in Pennsylvania
Schools in Montgomery County, Pennsylvania
Private middle schools in Pennsylvania
Educational institutions established in 1885
Haverford Township, Pennsylvania
Quaker schools in Pennsylvania
1885 establishments in Pennsylvania